The Anglican Primate of Australia is the senior bishop and President of the General Synod of the Anglican Church of Australia. Between General Synods, the Primate is also President of the Standing Committee of the General Synod which takes responsibility for the affairs of the General Synod in between General Synod sessions. The Primate is elected from among the country's Anglican diocesan bishops, by a Board of Electors, comprising diocesan bishops and representative clergy and laity.

List

References

Lists of Anglican bishops and archbishops
Lists of Anglicans
Anglicanism in Australia